Denis Petushinskiy (born 28 June 1967 in Irkutsk) is a retired pole vaulter who represented New Zealand after switching from Russia in 1998. He improved from 5.70 metres in 1992 to 5.90 metres in 1993 to win the Russian Championships. Later that year he finished sixth at the World Championships.

After becoming a New Zealand citizen, Petushinskiy originally won the silver medal at the 1998 Commonwealth Games with 5.55 metres, but was disqualified for testing positive to the banned drug Stanozolol, a type of steroid. His result would be a New Zealand record but was annulled.

International competitions

See also
List of doping cases in athletics
List of eligibility transfers in athletics

References

External links 

1967 births
Living people
Sportspeople from Irkutsk
Russian male pole vaulters
New Zealand male pole vaulters
Athletes (track and field) at the 1998 Commonwealth Games
Commonwealth Games competitors for New Zealand
World Athletics Championships athletes for Russia
Russian Athletics Championships winners
Doping cases in athletics
New Zealand sportspeople in doping cases
Russian sportspeople in doping cases